Romans 12:20 is a short film directed by the Shammasian Brothers and written by Geoff Thompson. It was released in 2008.

Plot
The film stars Craig Conway as 'Malky', a nightclub doorman with a violent character. However, during the course of the film Malky finds himself attending confession, but rather than for past crimes, he seeks redemption for an act he has yet to commit.

Cast
Luing Andrews - Bruiser #2
Craig Conway - Malky
James Ellis - Priest
Bill Fellows - Cid 2
Earl Ling - Bruiser #1
Neil McCaul - Cid 1
Lewis Slavin Sweeney - Young Malky

External links
Romans 12:20 at the Internet Movie Database

2008 action films
2008 short films
2008 films
British short films
2000s English-language films